Manon Stragier (born ) is a Belgian volleyball player. She is part of the Belgium women's national volleyball team.

She competed at the 2018 FIVB Volleyball Women's Nations League. 
On club level she plays for Asterix Kieldrecht.

References

External links 
https://www.nieuwsblad.be/cnt/dmf20171208_03232814
http://kw.knack.be/west-vlaanderen/sport/volleybal/manon-stragier-speelt-volgend-seizoen-bij-richa-michelbeke/article-normal-251609.html
http://www.avs.be/avsnews/regiospeelsters-bij-de-yellow-tigers

1999 births
Living people
Belgian women's volleyball players
Place of birth missing (living people)
21st-century Belgian women